"Lonely" is a song by English DJ and producer Joel Corry. It features uncredited vocals from English singer Harlee. It was released on 24 January 2020. On 20 March 2020, "Lonely" was certified Silver by the British Phonographic Industry, for moving 200,000 units in the UK.

Music video
The music video for the track was released on the 24 January 2020 and stars Aimee Corry, Cris Haris, Harlee and Joel Corry. Joel is a doctor in an institution that treats people obsessed with their smartphones. Directed by Eliot Simpson, who mentioned that the two main influences were the film "The Lobster" and the Black Mirror Episode "Nosedive". The video ends with all "patients" reconnecting with people without their phones and dance all together.

Track listing

Personnel
Credits adapted from Tidal.

 Joel Corry – producer, songwriter, keyboards
 Lewis Thompson – producer, songwriter, engineer, keyboards
 Neave Applebaum – producer, songwriter, engineer, keyboards, mixer
 Harlee – songwriter, vocals, additional vocal recording
 Robert Michael Nelson Harvey – songwriter, backing vocals
 Kevin Grainger – masterer, mixer

Charts

Weekly charts

Year-end charts

Certifications

References

2020 singles
2020 songs
Joel Corry songs
Asylum Records singles